Batería de la de la Reina, built between 1856 and 1861, was a colonial military defense fortress that had accommodations for a garrison of 250 men and 44 pieces of artillery. It was demolished in 1901. Its site was in the esplanade that today occupies the Antonio Maceo park. The fort was a semi-circular building with a 44-gun battery facing the sea. Its fires intersected with those of the Santa Clara Battery and the “Castillo de la Punta”.

Gallery

See also

 Caleta de San Lazaro
 Barrio de San Lázaro, Havana
 Espada Cemetery
 La Casa de Beneficencia y Maternidad de La Habana
 Hospital de San Lázaro, Havana
 Malecón, Havana

References

Buildings and structures in Havana
History of Havana
Spanish colonization of the Americas
20th century in Havana
19th century in Havana
Buildings and structures completed in 1781
18th-century establishments in Cuba
Neoclassical architecture in Cuba
Fortifications of Havana
Demolished buildings and structures in Cuba